Big Buffalo Creek is a  long 3rd order tributary to the Deep River in Lee County, North Carolina.

Course
Big Buffalo Creek is formed at the confluence of Skunk Creek and Persimmon Creek in Sanford, North Carolina and then flows northwest to the Deep River about 0.25 miles southeast of Cumnock, North Carolina.

Watershed
Big Buffalo Creek drains  of area, receives about 47.7 in/year of precipitation, and has a wetness index of 418.37 and is about 42% forested.

See also
List of rivers of North Carolina

References

Rivers of North Carolina
Rivers of Lee County, North Carolina